Governor Sanders may refer to:

Carl Sanders (1925–2014), 74th Governor of Georgia
Jared Y. Sanders Sr. (1869–1944), 34th Governor of Louisiana
Sarah Huckabee Sanders (born 1982), 47th Governor of Arkansas

See also
Alvin Saunders (1817–1899), 10th Governor of Nebraska Territory